Diaspora is the second studio album by American rapper GoldLink, released on June 12, 2019, by RCA Records. It follows the release of his previous album At What Cost (2017), and features guest appearances from Pusha T, Tyler, the Creator, Khalid, Wizkid, Jay Prince, Bibi Bourelly, WSTRN, Jackson Wang, Maleek Berry, Ari PenSmith, Lil Nei and WaveIQ.

Artwork 
The album cover features singer and model Justine Skye in neon green light, wearing '90s-style sunglasses with her hair pulled back and few earrings. It was photographed by Hailey Bieber.

Critical reception 

Diaspora received a score of 82 out of 100 based on reviews from six critics on review aggregator Metacritic, indicating "universal acclaim". Briana Younger argued in The New Yorker that the album comments on Blackness as a global phenomenon, observing that each of its songs "can be seen to represent some facet of blackness".

Track listing

Charts

References 

2019 albums
GoldLink albums
RCA Records albums